"Hey Stephen" is a song written and recorded by American singer-songwriter Taylor Swift for her second studio album, Fearless (2008), which was released by Big Machine Records. Inspired by a real-life infatuation, "Hey Stephen" is a song about an unrequited love. Produced by Swift and Nathan Chapman, it is a country pop and teen pop song that features girl-group-inspired drums, an upright-bass-propelled groove, and a subdued Hammond B-3. In reviews of Fearless, critics who picked "Hey Stephen" as an album highlight deemed its melody catchy and praised Swift's songwriting for earnestly portraying adolescent feelings. The song peaked at number 94 on the US Billboard Hot 100 and was certified gold by the Recording Industry Association of America (RIAA).

Swift included "Hey Stephen" to the set list of her first headlining tour, the Fearless Tour (2009–2010). Following the 2019 dispute regarding the ownership of Swift's back catalog, she re-recorded the song as "Hey Stephen (Taylor's Version)" for her re-recorded album Fearless (Taylor's Version) (2021), which was released by Republic Records. "Hey Stephen (Taylor's Version)" charted in Australia and Canada. In retrospective rankings, some reviewers remained positive but a few regarded the track as generic.

Background and writing 
Taylor Swift wrote songs for her second studio album, Fearless, while touring as an opening act for other country musicians to promote her self-titled debut studio album during 2007–2008, when she was 17–18 years old. She wrote most tracks by herself on the road. Continuing on the romantic themes of her first album, Swift chose to write songs about love and personal experiences from the perspective of a teenage girl to ensure her fans could relate to her songs. To this extent, Swift said that nearly every album track "has a face" that she associated with it. The end product is a collection of songs about the challenges of love with prominent high-school and fairy-tale lyrical imagery. Swift and producer Nathan Chapman recorded over 50 songs for Fearless, and "Hey Stephen" was one of the 13 tracks that made the final cut. They produced the track, and Justin Niebank mixed it at Blackbird Studios in Nashville. In the album liner notes, she included the hidden message for the song as "Love and Theft", referencing a country music duo who had opened shows for her.

When asked by Rolling Stone's Austin Scaggs if Stephen was a real-person name, Swift said: "I have no issue with naming names. My personal goal is for my songs to be so detailed that the guy the song is written about knows it's about him." The song's inspiration was Love and Theft's member Stephen Barker Liles, with whom she had had a friendly relationship. After Fearless was released, Swift texted him about the song. She recalled it was "fun" to put a personal confession on the album, which she was "going to have to deal with", and it was "interesting" to know what Liles had to say about it. Liles spoke to The Boot (2009): "I was very relieved when it turned out to be a nice song, and it's actually one of the nicest things anybody's ever done for me." He wrote "Try to Make It Anyway" as an answer song to Swift; although he had written it when they toured together, he only had time to finish recording it in 2011. The song was made available for download through the iTunes Store and streaming through YouTube in April 2011.

Releases 

"Hey Stephen" was released as an album cut on Fearless, on November 11, 2008, by Big Machine Records. It entered and peaked at number 94 on the US Billboard Hot 100 chart dated November 29, 2008. The Recording Industry Association of America (RIAA) certified the song gold, denoting 500,000 units based on sales and streaming. Swift performed the track live at her Australian concert debut at the Tivoli in Brisbane on March 5, 2009. "Hey Stephen" was part of the mid-show acoustic session on Swift's first headlining tour, the Fearless Tour (2009–2010). Midway through the performance, Swift went down the aisle to greet and hug her fans. On September 18, 2018, during Swift's St. Louis performance on the Reputation Stadium Tour, she performed "Hey Stephen" as a "surprise song".

After signing a new contract with Republic Records, Swift began re-recording her first six studio albums in November 2020. The decision came after a 2019 public dispute between Swift and talent manager Scooter Braun, who acquired Big Machine Records, including the masters of Swift's albums the label had released. By re-recording them, Swift had full ownership of the new masters, including the copyright licensing of her songs, devaluing the Big Machine-owned masters. The re-recording of "Hey Stephen", subtitled "Taylor's Version", was released as part of Fearless re-recording, Fearless (Taylor's Version). Swift and Christopher Rowe produced "Hey Stephen (Taylor's Version)", which was recorded by David Payne at Black Bird and Prime Recording Studios in Nashville. Rowe recorded Swift's lead vocals at Swift's home studio in London, and Serban Ghenea mixed the track at MixStar Studios in Virginia Beach, Virginia.

Swift released a snippet of "Hey Stephen (Taylor's Version)" onto her Twitter account on April 8, 2021, one day before Republic Records released Fearless (Taylor's Version). "Hey Stephen (Taylor's Version)" charted on singles charts in Australia (86) and Canada (68). It peaked at number 105 on the Billboard Global 200. In the United States, "Hey Stephen (Taylor's Version)" peaked at number one on the Bubbling Under Hot 100 and number 28 on Billboard Hot Country Songs chart.

Music and lyrics 

"Hey Stephen" is a country pop and teen pop song. It features a production that critics described as "smooth" and "playful". Instruments on the song include a gut string guitar, an upright bass that propels its groove, and a subdued Hammond B-3. The track incorporates a drum beat that Rob Sheffield of Rolling Stone found reminiscent of the Ronettes' "Be My Baby" (1963), and Maria Sherman of NPR Music said it evoked classic Motown girl-group records. "Hey Stephen" starts with Swift humming and has her singing with girl-group-styled ad-libs. Swift chuckles before the final refrain and the track ends with her humming to the band and steady finger snaps. In the original 2008 track, the finger snaps are credited to country musician Martina McBride's children and their friends, who visited Swift one day when she was at McBride's husband John's recording studio. The re-recorded "Hey Stephen (Taylor's Version)" features the same arrangement, which led to The New York Times journalist Joe Coscarelli commenting it sounded "more remastered than rerecorded". Michael A. Lee, a professor in commercial music, identified some minor changes: Swift's voice is richer and less breathy, and the cymbals in the break are louder.

The lyrics are about an unrequited love for a seemingly out-of-reach boy. The title character is a boy in whom "all the girls" are interested, and although they toss stones at his window to get his attention, Swift's character tells Stephen that she is the only one "waiting there even when it's cold". "Hey Stephen" incorporates some lyrical motifs that recurs on many of Swift's other songs, such as waiting for somebody by the window and rain ("Can't help it if I wanna kiss you in the rain so"). At one point, Swift sings, "Hey Stephen, why are people always leaving/ I think you and I should stay the same", which biographer Liv Spencer attributed to the impact of Swift touring on the road that "sometimes means too many goodbyes". In the bridge, Swift's character mentions the reason why Stephen should date her: "All those other girls, well they're beautiful, but would they write a song for you?" Critic Ken Tucker found this lyric to showcase Swift's "confident sense of humor", and musicologist James E. Perone commented that it aligned Swift with the 1970s singer-songwriter tradition of mentioning their songwriting profession in their own works. In a 2021 article for Gigwise, Kelsey Barnes commented "Hey Stephen" was an example of Swift's songwriting tropes: the track reflected her desire to be "seen, understood, and loved by others", a recurring theme on many of her later songs. Barnes also commented that it offered a glimpse into Swift's personal life before it became sensationalized in the press.

Critical reception 

In album reviews of Fearless, many critics picked "Hey Stephen" as a highlight. They positively remarked how "Hey Stephen" portrays universal teenage feelings towards love and infatuation—Craig S. Sermon of the Telegram & Gazette said; "Swift's loose and playful confession is enough to make anybody blush." Others praised Swift's songwriting for creating what they deemed a catchy melody. Larry Rodgers in The Arizona Republic dubbed the track "hummable pop" and Chris Richards in The Washington Post hailed its "irresistible smile" that could "permanently [lodge] itself in your hippocampus". Jody Rosen in a review for Rolling Stone selected the song as an example of Swift's songwriting on the album: "Her music mixes an almost impersonal professionalism—it's so rigorously crafted it sounds like it has been scientifically engineered in a hit factory—with confessions that are squirmingly intimate and true." In Slant Magazine, Jonathan Keefe picked "Hey Stephen" as one of the album's most charming cuts and praised the emotional sentiments that resonated with Swift's main audience of teenagers, but felt it lacked the sophistication that others credited her with.

In retrospective reviews of the song, Sheffield and Nate Jones from Vulture complimented its catchy melody. Jones wrote: "Swift is in the zone as a writer, performer, and producer on this winning deep cut." Some others were not as complimentary. Hazel Cills of Pitchfork said the track's "extreme specificity", which felt like "a copy of Swift’s yearbook we're somehow privy to", was too much for an already personal album. Mary Siroky in Consequence called "Hey Stephen" a catchy song, but its "repetitive melody" and "cliched" lyrical motifs make it the album's least compelling. For Perone, although the lyrics are conventional and generic, "Swift's performance and her melodic writing make the song enjoyable and engaging anyway".

Personnel 
"Hey Stephen" (2008)

 Taylor Swift – writer, producer
 Nathan Chapman – producer
 Drew Bollman – assistant mixer
 Chad Carlson – recording engineer
 Justin Niebank – mixer
 Andrew Bowers – finger snaps
 Burrus Cox – finger snaps
 Carolyn Cooper – finger snaps
 Lauren Elcan – finger snaps
 Delaney McBride – finger snaps
 Emma McBride – finger snaps
 Nicholas Brown – instruments

"Hey Stephen (Taylor's Version)" (2021)

 Taylor Swift – writer, producer, lead vocals
 Christopher Rowe – vocal recording, producer
 Max Bernstein – vibraphone
 Matt Billingslea – drums, finger snaps
 Caitlin Evanson – background vocals
 Derek Garten – additional engineer
 Serban Ghenea – mixing
 John Hanes – engineer
 Amos Heller – bass guitar
 Mike Meadows – acoustic guitar, Hammond B3, finger snaps, background vocals
 David Payne – recording
 Lowell Reynolds – assistant recording engineer
 Jonathan Yudkin – fiddle, fiddle recording

Charts

"Hey Stephen"

"Hey Stephen (Taylor's Version)"

Certification

Notes

References

Sources 

 
 

2008 songs
Taylor Swift songs
Songs written by Taylor Swift
Song recordings produced by Taylor Swift
Song recordings produced by Nathan Chapman (record producer)
Song recordings produced by Chris Rowe
Country pop songs